Nahir Ezequiel Bonacorso (born 9 August 1993) is an Argentine professional footballer who plays as a right-back for Estudiantes RC.

Career
Bonacorso's first club were Godoy Cruz of the Primera División. He was first an unused substitute for a match with Estudiantes on 21 February 2015, before making his senior debut on 30 April during a home victory against Sarmiento. Ten appearances followed in all competitions over the next two years with Godoy Cruz, including one in the 2017 Copa Libertadores versus Atlético Mineiro. On 31 July 2017, Bonacorso joined Primera B Nacional's Instituto. He scored his first career goal in a draw with Villa Dálmine in February 2018. Mitre signed Bonacorso on 17 June. However, in March 2019, he was sacked after insulting a fan on Instagram.

Career statistics
.

References

External links

1993 births
Living people
Sportspeople from Mendoza, Argentina
Argentine footballers
Association football fullbacks
Argentine Primera División players
Primera Nacional players
Godoy Cruz Antonio Tomba footballers
Instituto footballers
Club Atlético Mitre footballers
Club Atlético Brown footballers
Deportivo Maipú players
Estudiantes de Río Cuarto footballers